"Il nostro concerto" is a 1960 Italian song composed by Umberto Bindi (music) and Giorgio Calabrese (lyrics). The song premiered at the Italian Music Festival in New York, in which was performed by Miranda Martino and placed third. It eventually was Bindi's major hit, whose version topped the Italian hit parade for several months.
 
The symphonic structure of the song was inspired by Richard Addinsell's "Warsaw Concerto".

"Il nostro concerto" was covered by numerous artists, including  Claudio Baglioni, Claudio Villa, Sergio Franchi, Renato Zero, Giuseppe Di Stefano, Peppino di Capri, José Carreras, Massimo Ranieri, Demis Roussos, Les Compagnons de la chanson, Steve Lawrence, Gino Latilla,  Bob Azzam, Franck Pourcel, Pino Calvi, Jimmy Fontana, Fausto Papetti, Franco Simone, Luciano Tajoli, Christian, Paola Musiani.

Track listing

 7" single –  SRL 10-137
 "Il nostro concerto"  (Umberto Bindi, Giorgio Calabrese)
 "Tu" (Umberto Bindi, Giorgio Calabrese)

Charts

References

 

1959 singles
Italian songs
1959 songs
Number-one singles in Italy
Songs written by Umberto Bindi
Demis Roussos songs
Songs written by Giorgio Calabrese